Premier Lacrosse League (PLL) is an American professional field lacrosse league. The league's inaugural season debuted on June 1, 2019, and included a 14-week tour-based schedule taking place in 12 major-market cities.

The PLL gave out 14 awards prior to its first championship in Philadelphia, Pennsylvania, on June 29, 2019.

Active Awards

Jim Brown Most Valuable Player

Eamon McEneaney Attackman of the Year

Gait Brothers Midfielder of the Year

Dave Pietramala Defensive Player of the Year

Brodie Merrill Long Stick Midfielder of the Year

Paul Cantabene Faceoff Athlete of the Year

George Boiardi Short Stick Defensive Midfielder of the Year

Oren Lyons Goalie of the Year

Rookie of the Year

Dick Edell Coach of the Year

Jimmy Regan Teammate of the Year

Brendan Looney Leadership Award

Dave Huntley Sportsmanship Award

Welles Crowther Humanitarian Award

References

Awards
Premier League Awards
Lacrosse,Premier League Awards
Premier League Awards
Lacrosse,Premier League